Charles Theodor Petersen (13 December 1902 – 28 November 1979) was a Danish boxer who competed in the 1924 Summer Olympics. He was born in Copenhagen and died in Roskilde. In 1924 he was eliminated in the second round of the lightweight class after losing his fight to Haakon Hansen.

References

External links
profile

1902 births
1979 deaths
Lightweight boxers
Olympic boxers of Denmark
Boxers at the 1924 Summer Olympics
Danish male boxers
Sportspeople from Copenhagen